The Evanescence Tour was the third worldwide concert tour by American rock band Evanescence. Staged in support of their eponymous third studio album and comprising a set list of songs from that and their two previous albums, Fallen (2003) and The Open Door (2006), the tour began in August 2011 and ended in November 2012. It received mixed reviews by music critics who generally praised Lee's vocals and the performance of the other members of the band, but criticized their lack of interaction with the audience.

Background
During an interview with MTV News in July, Lee revealed the tour in support of their third studio album will start in August, 2011 with a concert in Nashville, Tennessee. She announced, 
"It's not all [confirmed], but it's going to happen." In an interview in August, she spoke about the tour saying, "We haven't started rehearsing [for the tour] yet, actually. ... It's just been a crazy run-around. We did a big photo shoot in L.A. for a couple days and I've been running around doing a lot of press." She added, "I wish I had more time to prepare... We're excited to get back out there. All we can do is just run as fast as we can. Everything's just crammed really tight, from the video to the promo to the rehearsal... I'm ready to get to rehearsal, because I'm starting to feel like, 'OK, we've got dates booked, we haven't practiced yet.' Starting to get a little nervous, but in a good way. ... [We'll] be back in front of the fans, and feeling that energy again. That's going to be good for my brain." She also revealed the nature of the tour, stating, "It's just going to be straight-up rock. Big energy, this album is just a fast-paced rock ride... We've got three albums now to pull from so, of course, we want to play the new ones but, of course, we're going to play the old ones too. It's going to be a lot." Lee further revealed that the band will play songs from all three albums and stated, "We're definitely focusing mainly on the new material. We're really excited about that music the most — obviously it's the newest — but of course we'll be playing some from both of our other albums too. I guess I'd say in general, our show's on the heavy-energy side, so we'll be running around singing a lot of fast songs."

Their performances were supported by The Pretty Reckless, Fair to Midland and Rival Sons. Lead singer Taylor Momsen of the band The Pretty Reckless stated she was a "big fan of Evanescence, so it's really exciting to be opening for them". On January 10, 2012, Lee asked her fans through Twitter to choose songs that would be performed during the set list of the Evanescence Tour.

Development

Evanescence began their tour in promotion of the album with a concert at War Memorial Auditorium in Nashville, Tennessee, on August 17, 2011. This was followed by performances at Rock on the Range in Winnipeg on August 20, Rock in Rio on October 2, and José Miguel Agrelot Coliseum, Puerto Rico on October 6. The band kicked off the tour in the United States on October 10 in Oakland, California, and finished in New York City. They also had concerts in the United Kingdom which kicked off at London's Hammersmith Apollo on November 4, 2011 and ran until November 13, when the band closed the tour at the O2 Academy Birmingham. The tour for Evanescence continued with concerts in the United States, Asia and Europe.

Critical reception

Sophie A. Schillaci of The Hollywood Reporter praised the performances of the band and Lee's live vocals saying that, "Lee delivered with high energy and an undeniably fierce vocal style". However, she noted, "But at times throughout the band's set, the at attention audience seemed only partly engaged. With several cell phones and even some actual lighters in the air, about half of the crowd obliged to the singer's requests for sing-a-longs. To their credit, that half gave it their all." Jon Pareles of The New York Times gave a positive review while reviewing one of the band's concerts during the tour. Pareles felt that when Lee was singing on the piano, she was similar to Tori Amos. He also praised the fact that the band uses "bottom-scraping bass, blasting guitars and double-bass-drum fibrillation to put hard-rock brawn behind what are actually tidy pop-song structures. The music makes sure to delineate verse, chorus and (briefly pretty) bridge, and to repeat them in the name of catchiness." He finished his review by saying,
"The band's most distinctive element is Ms. Lee's voice: high, strong and perpetually sustained, holding out every note of her long melody lines. It's the opposite of guttural hard rock, and the epitome of breath control. Onstage, pumping her fist and flipping her long dark hair, she veered in and out of tune, but her lung power never wavered. It was a virtuosic concert, exulting in sorrow, determination and thunderous impact. It was also a wearying one, as each song quickly hit its peak and just kept clobbering away. The production style for radio-ready rock and pop is now an unwavering, maxed-out, louder-than-loud onslaught. Evanescence carried that onto the stage, where there can be far more leeway with dynamics."

St. Louis Post-Dispatchs Kevin C. Johnson, reviewed a show by the band saying, "[it was a] quick run-through of material old and new. Not much of its sound has changed — good news for Evanescence's fans and bad news for its detractors." Joel Francis of The Kansas City Star said, "A convincing performance... by the band left little doubt that it was still not only a force to be reckoned with, but very much here to stay. As the four-piece band relentlessly hammered heavy riffs, singer Amy Lee glided across the stage and sashayed over the cacophony, her voice simultaneously tempering and reinforcing the ferocity below."

Opening acts
The Pretty Reckless
Fair to Midland
Rival Sons
Electric Touch
Blaqk Audio
The Used
LostAlone (UK Only)

Setlist

{{hidden
| headercss = background: #ccccff; font-size: 100%; width: 65%;
| contentcss = text-align: left; font-size: 100%; width: 90%;
| header = 2011 US Tour
| content =October 10, 2011 – November 21, 2011
"What You Want"
"Going Under"
"The Other Side"
"Weight of the World"
"The Change"
"Made of Stone"
"Lost in Paradise"
"My Heart Is Broken"
"Lithium"
"Sick"
"Oceans"
"Call Me When You're Sober"
"Imaginary"
"Bring Me to Life"
Encore
"Never Go Back"
"Your Star"
"My Immortal"
}}
{{hidden
| headercss = background: #ccccff; font-size: 100%; width: 65%;
| contentcss = text-align: left; font-size: 100%; width: 90%;
| header = 2012 setlist
| content =January 13, 2012 onward
"What You Want"
"Going Under"
"The Other Side"
"Weight of the World"
"The Change"
"My Last Breath"
"Made of Stone"
"Lost in Paradise"
"My Heart Is Broken"
"Lithium"
"Erase This"
"Sick"
"Call Me When You're Sober"
"Imaginary"
"Bring Me to Life"
Encore
"Never Go Back"
"Swimming Home"
"Your Star"
"My Immortal"
}}
{{hidden
| headercss = background: #ccccff; font-size: 100%; width: 65%;
| contentcss = text-align: left; font-size: 100%; width: 75%;
| header = Sydney
| content =
"What You Want"
"Going Under"
"The Other Side"
"Weight of the World"
"The Change"
"Made of Stone"
"Lost in Paradise"
"My Heart Is Broken"
"Lithium"
"Sweet Sacrifice"
"Call Me When You're Sober"
"Imaginary"
"Bring Me to Life"
Encore
"Swimming Home"
"Your Star"
"My Immortal"
}}
{{hidden
| headercss = background: #ccccff; font-size: 100%; width: 65%;
| contentcss = text-align: left; font-size: 100%; width: 90%;
| header = Austin
| content =
"What You Want"
"Going Under"
"The Other Side"
"Weight of the World"
"Made of Stone"
"Lost in Paradise"
"My Heart Is Broken"
"Lithium"
"Sick"
"The Change"
"Call Me When You're Sober"
"Imaginary"
"Bring Me to Life"
Encore
"Your Star"
"My Immortal"
}}
{{hidden
| headercss = background: #ccccff; font-size: 100%; width: 65%;
| contentcss = text-align: left; font-size: 100%; width: 90%;
| header = Rabat
| content =
"What You Want"
"Going Under"
"The Other Side"
"Weight of the World"
"Made of Stone"
"Lost in Paradise"
"My Heart Is Broken"
"Lithium"
"Sick"
"The Change"
"Call Me When You're Sober"
"Imaginary"
"Never Go Back"
"Bring Me To Life"
Encore
"Swimming Home"
"Your Star"
"My Immortal"
}}

{{hidden
| headercss = background: #ccccff; font-size: 100%; width: 65%;
| contentcss = text-align: left; font-size: 100%; width: 75%;
| header = Istanbul
| content =
"What You Want"
"Going Under"
"The Other Side"
"Weight of the World"
"Made of Stone"
"Lithium"
"Lost in Paradise"
"My Heart Is Broken"
"Sick"
"The Change"
"Whisper"
"Oceans"
"Call Me When You're Sober"
"Imaginary"
"Never Go Back"
"Bring Me to Life"
Encore
"Your Star"
"My Immortal"
}}
{{hidden
| headercss = background: #ccccff; font-size: 100%; width: 65%;
| contentcss = text-align: left; font-size: 100%; width: 75%;
| header = Springfield
| content =
"What You Want" 
"Going Under"
"The Other Side" 
"Weight of the World"
"Made of Stone"
"Lithium"
"Lost in Paradise"
"My Heart Is Broken"
"Sick"
"The Change"
"Whisper"
"Your Star"
"Call Me When You're Sober"
"Imaginary"
"Never Go Back"
"Bring Me to Life"
Encore
"Disappear"
"My Immortal"
}}
{{hidden
| headercss = background: #ccccff; font-size: 100%; width: 65%;
| contentcss = text-align: left; font-size: 100%; width: 75%;
| header = Porto Alegre
| content =
"What You Want"
"Going Under"
"The Other Side"
"Weight of the World"
"Made of Stone"
"Lithium"
"My Heart Is Broken"
"Lost in Paradise"
"Whisper"
"The Change"
"Oceans"
"Never Go Back"
"Call Me When You're Sober"
"Imaginary"
"If You Don't Mind"
"Bring Me to Life"
Encore
"Lacrymosa"
<li value="19">"My Immortal"
}}

Tour dates

Festivals and other miscellaneous performances

<small>
This concert was a part of Rock on the Range
These concerts were a part of Rock in Rio
This concert was a part of Buzzfest
These concerts were a part of Edgefest
This concert was a part of 98 Rock Fest
This concert was a part of the Rockville Festival
This concert was a part of Beale Street Music Festival
This concert was a part of Carolina Rebellion
This concert was a part of the Mawazine Festival
This concert was a part of Sonisphere Spain
This concert was a part of Rock am Ring
This concert was a part of the Nova Rock Festival
<small>

<small>
This concert was a part of the Zita Rock Festival
This concert was a part of Tuborg GreenFest
This concert was a part of the Tuborg Goldfest
This concert was a part of the Heineken Jammin' Festival
This concert was a part of 97.1 BFD
These concerts were a part of the Carnival of Madness tour
This concert was a part of Live Music Rocks
This concert was a part of the Ceará Music Festival
This concert was a part of the Asunción Rock Festival
This concert was a part of the Pepsi Music Festival
This concert was a part of Planeta Terra Bogotá

References

External links
 

2011 concert tours
2012 concert tours
Evanescence concert tours